Alicia Concepción Ricalde Magaña (born 10 November 1965) is a Mexican politician affiliated with the PAN. From 2012 to 2015 she served as Deputy of the LXII Legislature of the Mexican Congress representing Quintana Roo.

She also served as a member of the Congress of Quintana Roo from 1996 to 1999 and municipal president of Islas Mujeres from 2008 to 2011.

References

1965 births
Living people
Politicians from Quintana Roo
Women members of the Chamber of Deputies (Mexico)
National Action Party (Mexico) politicians
21st-century Mexican politicians
21st-century Mexican women politicians
Members of the Congress of Quintana Roo
20th-century Mexican politicians
20th-century Mexican women politicians
Deputies of the LXII Legislature of Mexico
Members of the Chamber of Deputies (Mexico) for Quintana Roo